Dennis Ray Edwards (born October 6, 1959) is a former American college and professional football player who was a defensive end in the National Football League (NFL) during the 1980s. He was drafted in the 9th round (245th pick overall) by the Buffalo Bills in the 1982 NFL Draft, and played for the Los Angeles Rams.

Biography
Edwards was born in Stockton, California and graduated from Edison High School. He played college football at the University of Southern California, where he lettered in football from 1978 to 1981.

Edwards was drafted in the 9th round (245th pick overall) by the Buffalo Bills in the 1982 NFL Draft. He played three regular season games in 1987 for the Los Angeles Rams.

See also
 History of the Los Angeles Rams

References

External links
 
 Flattery: Robinson can't say enough about his Trojans

1959 births
Living people
American football defensive ends
Los Angeles Rams players
Players of American football from Stockton, California
USC Trojans football players
National Football League replacement players